Bradenton Riverwalk (known locally as the Riverwalk) is a  public green space located along the Manatee River in Bradenton, Florida, between Business US 41 and South Tamiami Trail (US 301 / US 41 concurrently). 

The  park opened to the public on October 18, 2012 and features a skatepark, 400-seat amphitheater, playgrounds, and a splash pad. The area is maintained by the city of Bradenton and the nonprofit organization Realize Bradenton.

History

In the 1960s Bradenton dredged the Manatee River for silt, to add  of land adjacent to its downtown area. The area was dubbed "The Sand Pile" due to the river dredging projects. The park, Anthony T. Rossi Waterfront Park (or known simply as Waterfront Park or Rossi Park), was originally developed in the 1980s with the help of a federal grant. The boundaries of Rossi Park were from the Green Bridge (Business US 41 / 9th Street West) to the Hernando de Soto Bridge (US 301 / US 41 / 1st Street). The Bradenton Downtown Development Authority (BDDA) hired Kimley-Horn in June 2010 to design a substantial improvement to Rossi Park and the surrounding waterfront area. The construction of the Riverwalk broke ground in September 2011 and opened to the public on October 18, 2012.

Features
The Bradenton Riverwalk spans from slightly west of the Green Bridge, near South Florida Museum, to 2nd Street East, adjacent to Manatee Memorial Hospital. The Riverwalk includes playgrounds, splash pad, a lawn for picnics, a day dock for boaters, a skatepark, a botanical walk, sand volleyball courts, and a 400-seat Mosaic Amphitheater.

Public art is displayed throughout the Riverwalk area. One of the permanent art collections displayed is Postcards from the Friendly City. The collection consists of various large-scale art panel "postcards" depicting the history of the Manatee River and the Bradenton area.

Several weekly, monthly, and annual events are held at the Riverwalk. These events range from a weekly farmers' market, a seasonal "Music in the Park" family-friendly live music series, to annual events such as Bradenton Blues Festival and ArtSlam. The events attract approximately 110,000 people annually to the downtown Bradenton area.

Eastern extension
In April 2017, the city of Bradenton contracted Kimley-Horn and Associates, Inc. again to create a master plan for an eastern extension of the Bradenton Riverwalk. The eastern extension will extend the Riverwalk east to Manatee Mineral Springs Park and Manatee Village Historical Park.

The city also bought  of land north of Manatee Mineral Springs Park for $700,000 to expand the existing park and to ensure interconnectivity with the eastern expansion of the Riverwalk.

Gallery

References

External links
 Bradenton Riverwalk website at Realize Bradenton
 Bradenton Area CVB, a 360-degree view of the Riverwalk done in 2015 for the area's tourism board, Bradenton Area Convention and Visitors Bureau
 Walk Bradenton, a website by Realize Bradenton that is a guide to various points of interest in Downtown Bradenton

Parks in Florida
Parks in Manatee County, Florida
2012 establishments in Florida
Bradenton, Florida
Urban public parks